WTID (101.7 FM) is a radio station licensed to Graceville, Florida, United States. It serves the Dothan, Alabama, area. The station is owned by GFR, Inc.

In May 2020, WTOT-FM returned to the air with oldies. The call letters were changed to WTID, effectively swapping with 980 AM, on August 5, 2020.

In January 2022 WTID changed their format from oldies to contemporary Christian, branded as "The Joy FM".

References

External links

TID
1996 establishments in Florida
Radio stations established in 1996